J Aidan Carney (born 1934 in County Roscommon, Ireland), is a pathologist associated with the Mayo Clinic. He is best known for describing what became known as Carney syndrome, the separate phenomenon of Carney's triad, and Carney-Stratakis syndrome.

He graduated in medicine from University College Dublin in 1959, and interned in St. Vincent's. After further work in Dublin he moved to the Mayo Clinic in 1962, becoming consultant there in 1966. His doctorate in pathology at the University of Minnesota in 1969 was on the Morphology of Myosin and Thick Filament Diameter in Experimental Cardiac Hypertrophy.

References

Living people
Irish pathologists
Alumni of University College Dublin
1934 births
University of Minnesota Medical School alumni